Players and pairs who neither have high enough rankings nor receive wild cards may participate in a qualifying tournament held one week before the annual Wimbledon Tennis Championships.

Seeds

  Tomasz Bednarek /  Mateusz Kowalczyk (qualifying competition, lucky losers)
  Sanchai Ratiwatana /  Sonchat Ratiwatana (qualifying competition, lucky losers)
  David Martin /  Lovro Zovko (qualifying competition)
  Martin Fischer /  Philipp Oswald (first round)
  Alessandro Motti /  Simone Vagnozzi (first round)
  Rik de Voest /  Mischa Zverev (qualified)
  Yves Allegro /  Prakash Amritraj (first round)
  Ilija Bozoljac /  Harsh Mankad (qualified)

Qualifiers

  Somdev Devvarman /  Treat Huey
  Rik de Voest /  Mischa Zverev
  Jesse Levine /  Ryan Sweeting
  Ilija Bozoljac /  Harsh Mankad

Lucky losers

  Tomasz Bednarek /  Mateusz Kowalczyk
  Sanchai Ratiwatana /  Sonchat Ratiwatana

Qualifying draw

First qualifier

Second qualifier

Third qualifier

Fourth qualifier

External links

2010 Wimbledon Championships – Men's draws and results at the International Tennis Federation

Men's Doubles Qualifying
Wimbledon Championship by year – Men's doubles qualifying